Abdullah bin Khalid bin Ali Al Khalifa (born 1922 in Muharraq, died June 5, 2018) was an Bahraini writer, historian, poet, and politician, best-known for heading the country’s Supreme Council for Islamic Affairs.

References

External links
 Obituary in Akhbar Al Khaleej newspaper

House of Khalifa
1922 births
People from Muharraq
2018 deaths